Mihraç Akkuş (born on 1 June 2000) is a Turkish judoka.

He was the silver medalist at the 2020 Judo Grand Prix Tel Aviv and is bound to represent Turkey at the 2020 Summer Olympics.

References

External links
 

2000 births
Living people
Turkish male judoka
Judoka at the 2019 European Games
European Games competitors for Turkey
Judoka at the 2020 Summer Olympics
Olympic judoka of Turkey
Competitors at the 2022 Mediterranean Games
Mediterranean Games competitors for Turkey
21st-century Turkish people